Euplexia is a genus of moths of the family Noctuidae described by Stephens in 1829.

Description
Its eyes are naked with or without eyelashes. The proboscis is well developed. Palpi upturned, second joint not reaching vertex of head and fringed with hair. Whereas third joint is prominent. Thorax with a slight tuft of outspreading hair behind the collar and paired tufts on metathorax. Abdomen with dorsal tufts on proximal segments and tibia spineless. Forewings with crenulate cilia.

Species

References

 
 

 
Caradrinini